The 2009–10 A-1 League was the 19th season of the A-1 League, the highest professional basketball league in Croatia.
The first half of the season consisted of 10 teams and 90-game regular season (9 games for each of the 10 teams) began on Saturday, October 17, 2009 and ended on Sunday, March 14, 2010. The second half of the season consists of 4 teams from ABA League and the best 4 teams from first half of the season.

Team information

Venues and locations

Regular season

Champions Round

Relegation and Promotion Rounds

Relegation round

Promotion Round
Promotion League comprises five regional second division winners.

Playoffs
Teams in italics had home advantage. Teams in bold won the playoff series. Numbers to the left of each team indicate the team's original playoff seeding. Numbers to the right indicate the score of each playoff game.

External links
Official Site
Eurobasket.com League Page

A-1 Liga seasons
Croatian
A1